The Four Tops Greatest Hits is a greatest hits album by the Four Tops, released in August 1967. It peaked at No. 4 on the Billboard albums chart in the United States, remaining on the chart for 73 weeks, and is the first Motown album to reach No. 1 in Britain. It spent one week at the top of the UK Albums Chart in 1968. the original British release had 16 tracks on it; this is the US album. The additional tracks were "I'll Turn to Stone", "Where Did You Go?", "Darling, I Hum Our Song", and "You Keep Running Away".

Track listing

Charts

References

1968 greatest hits albums
Four Tops compilation albums
Motown compilation albums